Byron Bubb (born 17 December 1981) is a professional footballer, who plays for Southern Football League side Barton Rovers.

He usually plays as a winger, but can also operate in "the hole" if needed.

Born in England, he represented Grenada at international level.

Club career
Bubb began his career with Millwall making 20 first-team appearances before subsequently playing for Hendon, Slough Town, Boreham Wood, Aylesbury United, Hemel Hempstead Town, Cheshunt, Dover Athletic, AFC Wimbledon, Bromley, Harrow Borough, Burnham, Hillingdon Borough, Farnborough, Bedfont Town, Northwood and Dunstable Town.

Bubb spent the pre-season leading up to the 2011–12 season on trial with Northwood and scored against a Brentford XI on 30 July 2011. However, Bubb did not remain with Northwood and searched for a team elsewhere. He joined Hendon but was released in November 2011, eventually signing with Northwood's league counterparts Bedfont Town. In April 2012, Bubb joined Northwood on dual-registration for the final weeks of the season. His first appearance was as a substitute in Northwood's 3–2 win over Uxbridge in the semi-final of the Middlesex Senior Charity Cup on 3 April. His only league appearance came on 14 April 2012, in a win away to Beaconsfield, when he came on for the final 15 minutes. However upon the conclusion of the season, it remains unclear whether Bubb will re-sign for the team. He rejoined Singh Sabha Slough before having a short two-game spell at Dunstable Town in 2014. He joined Chalfont St Peter in August 2016 and Barton Rovers in November 2016.

International career
Bubb is a part of the Grenada national team having gained 10 caps and scored four international goals.

Personal life
He is the cousin of fellow player Alvin Bubb. His brother, Bradley, is also a footballer.

References

External links

"Bubb is the Don" – Bubb wins the FA's "Player of the Round" Award for his FA Cup Third Round Qualifying performance for AFC Wimbledon

1981 births
Living people
Footballers from Harrow, London
English footballers
Grenadian footballers
Grenada international footballers
Association football midfielders
Millwall F.C. players
Hendon F.C. players
Slough Town F.C. players
Boreham Wood F.C. players
Aylesbury United F.C. players
Hemel Hempstead Town F.C. players
Windsor & Eton F.C. players
Dover Athletic F.C. players
East Thurrock United F.C. players
Cheshunt F.C. players
Redbridge F.C. players
AFC Wimbledon players
Bromley F.C. players
Leyton F.C. players
Harrow Borough F.C. players
Burnham F.C. players
Farnborough F.C. players
Staines Town F.C. players
Bedfont Town F.C. players
Hillingdon Borough F.C. players
Northwood F.C. players
Dunstable Town F.C. players
Chalfont St Peter A.F.C. players
Barton Rovers F.C. players
English Football League players
Isthmian League players
Southern Football League players
2009 CONCACAF Gold Cup players
English sportspeople of Grenadian descent
Black British sportspeople